The following is a list of the municipalities (comuni) of Lazio, Italy.

There are 378 municipalities in Lazio (as of January 2019):

91 in the Province of Frosinone
33 in the Province of Latina
73 in the Province of Rieti
121 in the Metropolitan Metropolitan City of Rome Capital
60 in the Province of Viterbo

List

See also
List of municipalities of Italy

References

 
Geography of Lazio
Lazio